Wansjaliya Junction railway station  is a railway station serving in Jamnagar district of Gujarat state of India. It is under Bhavnagar railway division of Western Railway zone of Indian Railways. Passenger, Express trains halt here.

Major trains 

Following major trains halt at Wansjaliya Junction railway station in both direction:

 19015/16 Porbandar–Mumbai Central Saurashtra Express
 19571/52 Rajkot–Porbandar Express (via Jetalsar)
 19201/02 Secunderabad–Porbandar Weekly Express
 19261/62 Kochuveli–Porbandar Express
 12949/50 Porbandar–Santragachi Kavi Guru Superfast Express
 19263/64 Porbandar–Delhi Sarai Rohilla Express

References

Railway stations in Jamnagar district
Bhavnagar railway division